Vladimir Aleksandrovich Moiseyev (born 9 February 1988) is a former Russian professional football player.

Club career
He made his Russian Football National League debut for FC Anzhi Makhachkala on 7 October 2005 in a game against FC Oryol. He played 3 seasons in the FNL for Anzhi.

External links
 

1988 births
Living people
Russian footballers
FC Anzhi Makhachkala players
FC Dynamo Stavropol players
Association football defenders
FC Sheksna Cherepovets players